Dietrich Monstadt (born 15 September 1957) is a German politician of the Christian Democratic Union (CDU) who has been serving as a member of the Bundestag from the state of Mecklenburg-Vorpommern since 2009. He was born in Bochum, North Rhine-Westphalia.

Political career 
Monstadt has been a member of the Bundestag since the 2009 German federal election. He serves as on the Health Committee, where he is his parliamentary group's rapporteur on diabetes and obesity.

Political positions
Ahead of the Christian Democrats’ leadership election in 2018, Monstadt publicly endorsed Jens Spahn to succeed Angela Merkel as the party's chair.

He lost his constituency at the 2021 German federal election but was re-elected on the state list.

References

External links 

  
 Bundestag biography 

1957 births
Living people
Members of the Bundestag for Mecklenburg-Western Pomerania
Members of the Bundestag 2021–2025
Members of the Bundestag 2017–2021
Members of the Bundestag 2013–2017
Members of the Bundestag 2009–2013
Members of the Bundestag for the Christian Democratic Union of Germany